Papermoon is a guitar and vocals duo based in Vienna, Austria, that has released nine albums.

History 
Papermoon was started in 1991 by Christof Straub (guitar) and Edina Thalhammer (vocals). They had a successful career with acoustic music (guitar and vocals), during the 1990s, predominantly in Austria.
After their song “Night After Night” received frequent airplay on the Austrian radio station Ö3, Papermoon signed a recording contract in 1992. Their first album went double platinum with total sales over 100,000. Both of their follow-up albums went gold. Papermoon's most well-known songs are “Tell Me A Poem” and “Lucy’s Eyes.”

Edina Thalhammer left the group in 1996, for a period of almost seven years, during which she was replaced by Roumina Straub and later, for a short time, by Barbara Pichler. During this time, Papermoon released a maxi-single and a “Best Of” album (with three new titles). Edina Thalhammer embarked on a solo career in 2002 with her project “Tau."  In 2004, the original members of Papermoon reunited.

In 2006, Papermoon was awarded the Amadeus Austrian Music Award in the “Pop/Rock Group” category for the album “True Love.”

Members

Current members 
 Christof Straub - guitar
 Edina Thalhammer - vocals

Former members 
 Roumina Straub - vocals
 Barbara Pichler - vocals

Discography

Albums 
 1993 - Tell Me a Poem
 1994 - The World In Lucy's Eyes
 1996 - Papermoon
 2004 - Come Closer
 2005 - True Love
 2006 - Christmas Unplugged
 2007 - Verzaubert
 2008 - When the Lights Go Down
 2011 - Wake!

Compilations 
 2002 - Past and Present
 2005 - Austropop Kult

Singles 
 1992: Night After Night
 1992: Tell Me a Poem
 1993: Dancing Again
 1994: Lucy's Eyes
 1995: Catch Me
 1996: The Blue Sky of Mine
 1997: Sleep
 1998: Come Dance With Me
 2002: Doop Doop
 2002: Doop Doop X-Mas
 2004: I Was Blind
 2004: On the Day Before Christmas
 2007: Verzaubert (digital only)
 2007: The Time Is Now
 2008: The Fields of Summer
 2011: Wake
 2012: Vater, Father, mon pêre

References

External links 
 
 Papermoon pages at Universal Music Austria (in German)

Austrian pop music groups
Austrian musical duos
Musical groups from Vienna
1991 establishments in Austria
Musical groups established in 1991
Male–female musical duos
Pop music duos